KACB-LP (96.9 FM) is a radio station licensed to serve College Station, Texas. The station is owned by Saint Teresa Catholic Church. KACB-LP airs a Catholic radio format.

History
This station received its original construction permit from the Federal Communications Commission on December 9, 2004. The new station was assigned the KACB-LP call sign by the FCC on May 23, 2006. KACB-LP received its license to cover from the FCC on July 3, 2006.

References

External links
KACB-LP official website
 
Service area per the FCC

Catholic radio stations
Radio stations established in 2006
ACB-LP
College Station, Texas
ACB-LP